Elmer Gustaf "Swede" Rhenstrom (August 18, 1895 – December 26, 1967) was World War I ace and later airline manager. He was also a football player for a brief time.

Biography
Rhenstrom was born in Kenosha, Wisconsin. He was the son of Anthony Rhenstrom (1865–1955) and Emma Stahl Rhenstrom (1866–1939), both immigrants from Sweden. He served as a pilot in France during the First World War, where he shot down two (unofficially three) enemy aircraft, for which he was referred to as an ace. He was awarded the Silver Star in 1941 for his activity during the war.

After the war, Rhenstrom married Dorothy Virginia Miles in 1920. He was briefly a player in the National Football League for the Racine Legion in 1922 as an end. He had earlier played at the collegiate level at Beloit College.

In 1928 he joined Fairfield Aviation in Riverside, Ohio, and in 1929 he became a manager at Texas Air Transport Inc. In the 1940s he was an officer at Scott Field near Belleville, Illinois.

References

1895 births
1967 deaths
Beloit Buccaneers football players
Players of American football from Wisconsin
People from Kenosha, Wisconsin
Racine Legion players
Sportspeople from the Milwaukee metropolitan area